Bereket Mengisteab (ትግርኛ: በረኸት መንግስተአብ, 1938) is a well-known Eritrean songwriter, composer and singer and is known as the "Godfather of Eritrean music".

Life and work

Early life
He spent his early life in the village farming, taught himself to play the Krar and took part in the musical events that were part of the local rural culture. He moved to Asmara for a few years where his musical performances were limited to his friends.

Addis Ababa

In 1961 he moved to Addis Ababa and joined the Haile Selassie Theater Orchestra. He remained with the orchestra for over a decade and performed with them all over Ethiopia as well as Kenya, Uganda, Tanzania, at the 1966 Festival mondial des Arts Nègres in Senegal, and at the 1968 Summer Olympics in Mexico. He recorded his first singles during this period, nine singles for the Philips label. He left the orchestra 1973, a year before Haile Selassie was deposed by the "Derg" led by Mengistu Haile Mariam. During mid-1970s Mengisteab was the only Eritrean artist broadcast on the radio, his krar music and usage of the Tigrinya language assured his popularity. While living in Addis Ababa, Mengisteab and his wife ran a music shop. He formed his own group in Addis Ababa, Megaleh Guayla (echo of the dance)

Eritrean Liberation Front
In 1974, Mengisteab joined the Eritrean Liberation Front (ELF) to fight for Eritrean independence. He received military training like all members of the ELF and fought in mountains of Eritrea. Mengisteab was also part of the official ELF band. The ELF (and the EPLF, the Eritrean People's Liberation Front) formed cultural troupes as part of their attempts to establish an Eritrean "folk culture". Mengisteab was one of several experienced artists who contributed to the ELF's sociocultural and political transformation and nationalist propaganda efforts. The cultural troupes toured "liberated areas" under the liberation front's control putting on shows for fighters and civilians. Mengisteab performed revolutionary songs, nationalist anthems and ballads in the military camps and villages.

Exile
Like many other ELF fighters, he went into exile in Saudi Arabia, moved to Jeddah in 1979, where he remained for ten years. During that decade he often performed in Saudi Arabia, Sudan, and Djibouti and made his North American debut in 1980. He recorded ten cassettes during his time in Jeddah.

Return
In 1993, when Eritrea declared its independence and gained international recognition, Mengisteab was invited to tour the country and performed in Massawa, Keren, and Asmara. He left Jeddah and moved back to Addis Ababa to re-open his music shop with his wife. He left Ethiopia in 1998 when the Eritrean–Ethiopian War broke out and moved to Asmara in Eritrea. Since moving to Asmara, Mengisteab has continued to compose and perform music. He has toured and released about one new cassette each year. He also runs a music shop, "B. M. Music House", in Babylon square, Asmara.

Music
In a 2009 interview, Mengisteab said he has recorded about 200 songs out of a total of 250 songs he has composed over the past fifty years.

Discography

Albums
Hagerey Afqire (c. 1978)
Bitihti Gezana (Guitar Version)(c. 1979)
Baburey (c. 1980)
Libey-Vol. 5 (1984)
Hagerey-Vol. 7 (1987)
Tarik-Vol.8 (1990)
Natsnet-Vol. 9 (1991)
Bshimkum-Vol. 10 (1992)
Nehna Hager-Vol. 11 (1993)
Alimna-Vol. 12 (1995)
Hizbi Ertra-Vol. 13 (1999)
Tsnat-Vol. 14 (2001)
Hizbi Alem-Vol. 15 (2007)
Balena-Vol. 21 (2011)

Compilation albums
Bereket Mengisteab (1961-1974) Vol. 1-Embaba Adey (2003)
Bereket Mengisteab (1961-1974) Vol. 2-Milena (2004)
Bereket Mengisteab (1961-1974) Vol. 3-Meley (2005)
Bereket Mengisteab (1961-1974) Vol. 4-Ufey Breri (2005)

References

Further reading

1938 births
20th-century Eritrean male singers
People from Central Region (Eritrea)
Living people
Krar players
21st-century Eritrean male singers